V. C. Palanisamy Gounder (died 15 April 1965) was an Indian merchant and politician of the Indian National Congress who served as Minister of Prohibition of the Madras State in the cabinet of C. Rajagopalachari and Minister for Animal Husbandry and Harijan Welfare in K. Kamaraj's cabinet.

Biography 

A native of Coimbatore, Gounder hailed from a family of wealthy textile merchants. In 1937, Gounder was nominated to the Madras Legislative Council representing cotton-growers of the province. Gounder died on 15 April 1965.

References 

1965 deaths
Members of the Tamil Nadu Legislative Council
People from Coimbatore
Year of birth missing
Indian merchants
Indian National Congress politicians from Tamil Nadu
Madras MLAs 1952–1957